George Bickham the Younger (c. 1706–1771) was an English etcher and engraver, a printseller, and one of the first English caricaturists.

He produced didactic publications, political caricatures, and pornographical prints. He was the son of the engraver George Bickham the Elder (1684–1758), who published the Universal Penman (1733–41).

References

1706 births
1771 deaths
English caricaturists
English engravers
English etchers